The 1984 United States presidential election in North Dakota took place on November 6, 1984. All 50 states and the District of Columbia, were part of the 1984 United States presidential election. State voters chose three electors to the Electoral College, which selected the president and vice president of the United States. North Dakota was won by incumbent United States President Ronald Reagan of California, who was running against former Vice President Walter Mondale of Minnesota. Reagan ran for a second time with former C.I.A. Director George H. W. Bush of Texas, and Mondale ran with Representative Geraldine Ferraro of New York, the first major female candidate for the vice presidency.

The presidential election of 1984 was a very partisan election for North Dakota, with over 98% of the electorate voting for either the Democratic or Republican parties, though several parties appeared on the ballot. Every county gave either Mondale or Reagan a majority; the vast majority--all but two--gave Reagan a majority. Reagan's best county was McIntosh County, where he got 81.5% of the vote; Mondale's was Sioux County, where he got 58.6% of the vote. Reagan exceeded 70% in 15 counties, including Stark (Dickinson), the state's seventh-largest at the time.

North Dakota weighed in for this election as 13% more Republican than the national average. Reagan won North Dakota by a landslide 31-point margin. His 64.84% vote share made it his twelfth-best state. He carried every county in the state save the majority Native American counties of Sioux and Rolette; he had previously carried Sioux County in 1980. He performed well in both the more populous counties--earning over 60% of the vote in Cass County (Fargo) and Grand Forks County (Grand Forks), and over 2/3 of the vote in Burleigh County (Bismarck) and Ward County (Minot)--as well as in its more rural areas. In only eight counties (including the two he lost) did his vote share even dip below his national share of 58.8%, and in only two (Sargent and Benson) was the margin less than 5%. None of these counties cast more than 4,000 votes.

Apart from its vote for Woodrow Wilson in the nationally close election of 1916 and its vote for Populist James Weaver in 1892, North Dakota has been a typically Republican state since its admittance in 1889. Indeed, no Republican has won the White House without North Dakota since its admittance to the Union. Alone amongst the free-soil Plains West states, it resisted the appeal of William Jennings Bryan in 1896, and was Warren Harding's best state in 1920. Even so, Reagan's victory in the state was one of the stronger ones compared to other recent Republican landslide winners. His vote share exceeded, for example, Nixon's in 1972 and Eisenhower's in 1956 (although not Eisenhower's in 1952). Reagan's particularly strong appeal in the Flickertail State was first on display in 1980, when Reagan exceeded his national vote share by over 10% in the state (already exceeding the vote shares won by both Nixon in 1972 and Eisenhower in 1956). Reagan's 64.84% vote share would remain unsurpassed until 2020, when Donald Trump received 65.11% in the state. Even so, North Dakota was the state that trended most strongly Democratic in 1984, as Mondale lost the state by 7% less than Carter had done in 1980.

For the 16th election in a row, North Dakota voted the same as the other three free-soil Plains West states (South Dakota, Nebraska, and Kansas). Since the Dakotas were admitted to the Union in 1889, the four states have disagreed only in 1892, 1896, 1912, and 1916. This region has been a stronghold for the Republican Party since shortly after its founding and, aside from partial flirtations with Bryan and Wilson, has remained so ever since.

Democratic platform
Walter Mondale accepted the Democratic nomination for presidency after pulling narrowly ahead of Senator Gary Hart of Colorado and Rev. Jesse Jackson of Illinois - his main contenders during what would be a very contentious Democratic primary. During the primary campaign, Mondale was vocal about reduction of government spending, and, in particular, was vocal against heightened military spending on the nuclear arms race against the Soviet Union, which was reaching its peak on both sides in the early 1980s.

Taking a (what was becoming the traditional liberal) stance on the social issues of the day, Mondale advocated for gun control, the right to choose regarding abortion, and strongly opposed the repeal of laws regarding institutionalized prayer in public schools. He also criticized Reagan for his economic marginalization of the poor, stating that Reagan's reelection campaign was "a happy talk campaign," not focused on the real issues at hand.

A very significant political move during this election: the Democratic Party nominated Representative Geraldine Ferraro to run with Mondale as Vice-President. Ferraro is the first female candidate to receive such a nomination in United States history. She said in an interview at the 1984 Democratic National Convention that this action "opened a door which will never be closed again," speaking to the role of women in politics.

Republican platform

By 1984, Reagan was very popular with voters across the nation as the President who saw them out of the economic stagflation of the early and middle 1970's, and into a period of (relative) economic stability.

The economic success seen under Reagan was politically accomplished (principally) in two ways. The first was initiation of deep tax cuts for the wealthy, and the second was a wide-spectrum of tax cuts for crude oil production and refinement, namely, with the 1980 Windfall profits tax cuts. These policies were augmented with a call for heightened military spending, the cutting of social welfare programs for the poor, and the increasing of taxes on those making less than $50,000 per year. Collectively called "Reaganomics", these economic policies were established through several pieces of legislation passed between 1980 and 1987.

Some of these new policies also arguably curbed several existing tax loopholes, preferences, and exceptions, but Reaganomics is typically remembered for its trickle down effect of taxing poor Americans more than rich ones. Reaganomics has (along with legislation passed under presidents George H. W. Bush and Bill Clinton) been criticized by many analysts as "setting the stage" for economic troubles in the United States after 2007, such as the Great Recession.

Virtually unopposed during the Republican primaries, Reagan ran on a campaign of furthering his economic policies. Reagan vowed to continue his "war on drugs," passing sweeping legislation after the 1984 election in support of mandatory minimum sentences for drug possession.  Furthermore, taking a (what was becoming the traditional conservative) stance on the social issues of the day, Reagan strongly opposed legislation regarding comprehension of gay marriage, abortion, and (to a lesser extent) environmentalism, regarding the final as simply being bad for business.

Results

Results by county

See also
 United States presidential elections in North Dakota
 Presidency of Ronald Reagan

References

North Dakota
1984
1984 North Dakota elections